Westerly is a town on the southwestern shoreline of Washington County, Rhode Island, first settled by English colonists in 1661 and incorporated as a municipality in 1669. It is a beachfront community on the south shore of the state with a population of 23,359 as of the 2020 census.

The Pawcatuck River flows on the western border of Westerly and was once renowned for its own species of Westerly salmon, three of which are on the town's official seal. It also serves as the boundary between Westerly and Pawcatuck, Connecticut. Three large salt ponds lie along the coast of Westerly which serve as shallow, reef-like pools whose outer walls form the long, white beaches for which the town is renowned. From west to east, these ponds are Maschaug Pond, Winnapaug Pond, and Quonochontaug Pond.

The Westerly area was known for its granite and stone-cutting industry, which quarried a unique stone known as Westerly granite. This pinkish granite is ideal for statuary and has been used in numerous government buildings of several states on the eastern seaboard.

Westerly becomes a popular tourist destination during the summer months when the population nearly doubles. Its well-known beaches include Weekapaug Beach, Westerly Town Beach, Misquamicut State Beach, East Beach, and Watch Hill Beach.

History

Westerly's primary industries today are textiles and tourism, but the town was historically famous for its granite, quarried in Bradford and Potter Hill.

Westerly was named for the settlement's location respective to Rhode Island's geography, being the westernmost town in the Colony of Rhode Island and Providence Plantations. The English village was the home of Elder John Crandall (–1676), one of Westerly's founding fathers. Crandall settled in Westerly in 1661, and the early history of Westerly contains many references to him and his sons.

The four trolley lines of the Groton and Stonington Street Railway, Norwich and Westerly Railway, Pawtucket Valley Street Railway, and the Ashaway and Westerly Railway converged in Westerly and shared track between the railroad station and Dixon House Square downtown. The lines were built in the 1890s and 1900s and ran until the 1920s.

Physician, American Revolution general, and Rhode Island Supreme Court justice Dr. Joshua Babcock was born in Westerly, as was Chief Justice and Governor of Rhode Island Samuel Ward.

Tropical cyclones
Due to its location, Westerly is vulnerable to tropical storms and hurricanes. Westerly was devastated in 1938, 1944, and 1954 by several major hurricanes. In 2012, Hurricane Sandy left beaches along the Westerly shoreline devastated and nearly unrecognizable, including Misquamicut. Rhode Island Governor Lincoln Chafee stated that Misquamicut was "our New Jersey," referring to the amount of damage that was received in the state of New Jersey. In 2021, Tropical Storm Henri made landfall in Westerly, causing significant damage and power outages.

Geography
According to the United States Census Bureau, the town has a total area of 74.8 square miles (193.8 km2), of which, 30.1 square miles (77.9 km2) of it is land and 44.7 square miles (115.8 km2) of it (59.78%) is water.

Westerly sits atop a glacial moraine, a series of small hills of debris left behind by receding glaciers in the last Ice Age. A pristine sample of the moraine encompasses a  preserve owned in perpetuity by the Westerly Land Trust. Within the trust land are the rare kettle formations that extend out under the sea to Block Island.

Climate
Westerly has a humid subtropical climate (Köppen Cfa) according to most recent temperature averages.

Villages
Westerly consists of a number of small villages. Downtown Westerly on the Pawcatuck River is the municipal seat of the area, with the old town post office, library, YMCA, railroad station, former police headquarters (the current headquarters is located on Airport Road), granite buildings, and Wilcox Park.

Other villages include Avondale, with antique colonial-style and Queen Anne-style homes; Bradford, with its own post office and postal code; Dunn's Corners; Mastuxet; Misquamicut, a beachfront community with small amounts of nightlife and several hotels; Potter Hill, where the Town Forest is located; Shelter Harbor; Watch Hill, with beaches and summer cottages; Weekapaug; White Rock; and Winnapaug, with public golf courses.

The town holds a number of annual events, such as the Pawcatuck River Duck Race in April, Virtu Art Festival in May, Shakespeare in the Park and the Summer Pops (hosted by the Chorus of Westerly) in June, and Riverglow in July. In recent years, the Westerly-Pawcatuck Chamber of Commerce's events have attracted many visitors, including big screen movies on the beach through July and August, Westerly's Columbus Day parade in October, and several beachfront events. Also, the Westerly-Pawcatuck Veterans Board of Control hold two of the oldest parades in the United States. The Memorial Day Parade started in 1867, held in May on Memorial Day, and the Veterans Day Parade started in 1917, held in November on the Saturday of Veterans Day week.

The former granite mining and stone-cutting industry is historically important. Its quarries produced blue granite, in addition to pinks and reds. The Smith Granite Company employed many granite cutting craftsmen and was one of the town's major employers until the quarries stopped operating in the 1950s. Hundreds of examples of their work can be seen on the battlefields of Gettysburg and in city squares, municipal buildings, cemeteries throughout the United States, and even the Georgia State Capitol.

The Guild Guitar Company was founded in 1952 by Alfred Dronge in New York City. They moved production to Westerly in 1966 and continued to make their well-respected archtop, acoustic, and solid body guitars there until 2001, when they were bought by Fender Musical Instruments and production was moved to Corona, California.

Demographics

As of the census of 2000, there were 22,966 people, 9,402 households, and 6,130 families residing in the town. The population density was 763.3 people per square mile (294.7/km2). There were 11,292 housing units at an average density of 375.3 per square mile (144.9/km2). The racial makeup of the town was 95.17% White, 0.71% Black or African American, 0.57% Native American, 1.99% Asian, 0.34% from other races, and 1.22% from two or more races. Hispanic or Latino of any race were 1.18% of the population.

There were 9,402 households, out of which 29.7% had children under the age of 18 living with them, 50.2% were married couples living together, 11.0% had a female householder with no husband present, and 34.8% were non-families. Of all households, 29.0% were made up of individuals, and 12.5% had someone living alone who was 65 years of age or older. The average household size was 2.40 and the average family size was 2.98.

In the town, the population was spread out, with 23.5% under the age of 18, 7.0% from 18 to 24, 29.7% from 25 to 44, 22.7% from 45 to 64, and 17.0% who were 65 years of age or older. The median age was 39 years. For every 100 females, there were 93.2 males. For every 100 females age 18 and over, there were 89.6 males.

The median income for a household in the town was $44,613, and the median income for a family was $53,165. Males had a median income of $37,887 versus $26,800 for females. The per capita income for the town was $24,092. About 4.3% of families and 6.7% of the population were below the poverty line, including 9.6% of those under age 18 and 6.6% of those age 65 or over.

The most frequent ancestries among the town's population are Italian (34.2%), Irish (17.9%) and English (14.2%). Many Italians moved to Westerly from Italy around the start of the 20th century (particularly from Sicily and Calabria), and Italian dialects are still spoken at the homes of many older residents.

Economy
Washington Trust Bancorp Inc., a publicly traded regional bank with operations in Rhode Island and Connecticut, is headquartered in Westerly.

Transportation 
The Westerly State Airport offers service by one commercial airline. Amtrak offers service between Washington, DC and Boston, stopping at the Westerly station near downtown. The station itself was closed in October 2016, but passengers can still board and disembark at the platform. Additionally, there have been proposals for CTrail to extend its Shore Line East service eastwards to Westerly station.

Westerly has U.S. Route 1 and state routes 1A, 3, and 91. Route 78 forms a bypass around Westerly downtown and ends near Westerly Airport, with three interchanges in Rhode Island; the other endpoint is in Stonington, Connecticut. Interstate 95 is approximately 5 miles away and can be reached by Connecticut Route 2 and by Rhode Island Route 3.

Points of interest

 Westerly High School
 Westerly Town Beach
 Misquamicut State Beach
 Watch Hill
 Westerly (Amtrak station)
 Westerly State Airport
 Wilcox Park
 Christopher Columbus Memorial statue by Charles H. Pizzano

National Historic Register sites
 Babcock-Smith House
 Bradford Village Historic District, in Hopkinton and Westerly
 Flying Horse Carousel
 Former Immaculate Conception Church
 Lewis-Card-Perry House
 Main Street Historic District
 North End Historic District
 Nursery Site, RI-273
 Perry Homestead Historic District
 Ram Point
 U.S. Post Office (Westerly, Rhode Island)
 Watch Hill Historic District
 Weekapaug Inn
 Westerly Armory
 Westerly Downtown Historic District
 Wilcox Park Historic District

Notable people

See also

 National Register of Historic Places listings in Washington County, Rhode Island

References

External links

 Official website

 
Towns in Washington County, Rhode Island
Populated coastal places in Rhode Island
Italian-American culture in Rhode Island
1669 establishments in Rhode Island
Towns in Rhode Island